Darvand in Iran may also refer to:
Darvand, Ilam
Darvand-e Sartang, Ilam Province
Darvand, Kermanshah
Darvand, Harsin, Kermanshah Province
Darvand 1, Kermanshah Province
Darvand 2, Kermanshah Province
Darvand 3, Kermanshah Province
Darvand-e Zard (disambiguation)

See also
Darband (disambiguation)